Depot Glacier is a well-defined valley glacier, flanked by lateral moraines, which terminates in a high vertical ice cliff at the head of Hope Bay, in the northeast end of the Antarctic Peninsula. It was discovered by the Swedish Antarctic Expedition, 1901–04, under Otto Nordenskiöld, and so named by him because, as seen from Antarctic Sound, it appeared to be a possible site for a depot.

See also
 List of glaciers in the Antarctic
 Glaciology

References

Glaciers of Trinity Peninsula